University of Human Sciences and Technology of Lugano is an Applied Sciences public university located in the city of Lugano, in the Canton of Ticino, Switzerland.

The university was established in 1999.

Courses 
The university offers both undergraduate and post-graduate courses.

References

External links 
 

Human Sciences and Technology of Lugano
Lugano
Schools in the canton of Ticino
Educational institutions established in 1999
1999 establishments in Switzerland
Culture in Lugano